Gaetano Palazzi  (Bologna, 1832–1892) was an Italian painter.

He was a resident of Bologna. He exhibited in 1883 at Rome, two paintings: L'asso di briscola and La Nonna e la nipotino; at the 1886 Exhibition of Milan, he submitted another canvas entitled lI Carnevale; and at the Exhibition Nazionale di Bologna two canvases, depicting intimate family and carnaval scenes.

References

19th-century Italian painters
Italian male painters
Painters from Bologna
1832 births
1892 deaths
19th-century Italian male artists